The World Group was the highest level of Fed Cup competition in 2018.

Participating teams 
{| class="wikitable" style="width:100%;"
|-
!colspan=4|Participating teams
|-
!style="width:25%;"| 
!style="width:25%;"| 
!style="width:25%;"| 
!style="width:25%;"| 
|-
!style="width:25%;"| 
!style="width:25%;"| 
!style="width:25%;"| 
!style="width:25%;"| 
|}

 Seeds 

 Draw

Quarterfinals

Belarus vs. Germany

Czech Republic vs. Switzerland

France vs. Belgium

United States vs. Netherlands

Semifinals

Germany vs. Czech Republic

France vs. United States

Final

Czech Republic vs. United States

References 

World Group